Federal Route 245 (formerly Negeri Sembilan State Route N21) is a federal road in Negeri Sembilan, Malaysia. The Kilometre Zero of the Federal Route 245 is at Serting Ulu.

Features
At most sections, the Federal Route 245 was built under the JKR U5 road standard, with a speed limit of 50 km/h.

List of junctions and towns

References

Malaysian Federal Roads